The Elgi Plateau is a plateau in the Sakha Republic, Far Eastern Federal District, Russian Federation.

The area is named after the Elgi River, a left tributary of the Indigirka. Formerly there was the Elginsky urban-type settlement by the left bank of river Elgi. It belonged to the Oymyakon District and was abolished in 2007.

Geography  
The Elgi Plateau covers the central Yana-Oymyakon Highlands, in the upper Elgi, Tompo and Delinya River basins. The plateau is bound by the Verkhoyansk Range to the west and the Chersky Range to the northeast, the Yana Plateau to the northwest, the Suntar-Khayata Range to the southwest and the Oymyakon Plateau to the southeast. 

Dome-shaped peaks rise between the interfluves, where there are areas of small lakes and moorland.

Flora
Forests of larch taiga generally cover the flat areas and lower slopes, and in the higher elevations Siberian pine, giving way to alpine tundra in the mountaintops. Willows and poplars may grow in the floodplains of the intermontane basins.

References

External links
Physiogeography of the Russian Far East

Mountain ranges of the Sakha Republic